The New Zealand Arbitration Act 1996 came into force on 1 July 1997, and replaced the Arbitration Act 1908. It was reprinted (with amendments) in 2018.

References

External links
 Text of the Act

Statutes of New Zealand
1996 in New Zealand law
Arbitration law